Sepiola is a genus of bobtail squid comprising around 15 species:

Sepiola affinis Naef, 1912, anagolous bobtail
Sepiola atlantica d'Orbigny in Ferussac & d'Orbigny, 1839-1841, Atlantic bobtail
Sepiola aurantiaca  Jatta, 1896, golden bobtail
Sepiola birostrata Sasaki, 1918, butterfly bobtail
Sepiola boletzkyi Bello & Salman, 2015
Sepiola bursadhaesa Bello, 2013
Sepiola intermedia Naef, 1912, intermediate bobtail
Sepiola knudseni Adam, 1984
Sepiola ligulata Naef, 1912, tongue Bobtail
Sepiola parva Sasaki, 1914
Sepiola pfefferi Grimpe, 1921
Sepiola robusta Naef, 1912, robust bobtail
Sepiola rondeleti Leach, 1817, dwarf bobtail
Sepiola rossiaeformis Pfeffer, 1884
Sepiola steenstrupiana Levy, 1912, Steenstrup's bobtail
Sepiola tridens de Heij & Goud, 2010
Sepiola trirostrata Voss, 1962

References

External links

Bobtail squid
Marine molluscs of Africa
Marine molluscs of Asia
Marine molluscs of Europe
Cephalopod genera